The Choral Synagogue was a synagogue in Georgievskaya Street 18, in Mariupol, Ukraine. It was established in the house of the merchant Anton Chabanenko in 1882.

History
The first mention of the Jewish settlement in Mariupol dates back to 1820. From that time until the beginning of the twentieth century, five synagogues and houses of worship were opened in the city.

Synagogue, Harlampievskaya Street
According to the book Mariupol and its Environs (1892), a first synagogue was built in 1864 on Harlampievskaya Street at the initiative of artisan Abram Freiman. It was one of the oldest religious buildings in Mariupol. At present, only part of the foundation and an arched gate are surviving.

Choral Synagogue, Georgievskaya Street
The Choral Synagogue in Georgievskaya Street 18 was the second synagogue in Mariupol, and was established in the house of the merchant Anton Chabanenko in 1882. It was considered the second Jewish house of prayer in the history of the city.

One of the initiators of the opening of the synagogue was Iosif I. Averbakh (Auerbach), the father of academic Mikhail Iosifovich Averbakh, one of the founders and first director of the Helmholtz Central Institute of Ophtalmology.

Some sources claim that the synagogue was destroyed during the Nazi occupation of Mariupol during World War II.

Other sources inform that with the rise of the Bolsheviks in the early 20th century, the building of the synagogue was turned into a gymnasium, which it remained until the start of World War II. The building was practically not damaged during active hostilities. There is a version that the Germans opened a hospital in it, and when they retreated, tried to set fire to the building.

One of the Torah scrolls survived the history of the synagogue and was transferred to the adjacent Mariupol Museum of Local Lore for storage.

After World War II, the building repeatedly changed owners and functions. Until 1995, the building was considered communal property. Since 2016, the land has been owned by the Jewish community of Mariupol, but the building itself continued to be owned by a private individual.

During the 1990s, the roof collapsed under heavy snow. Today, only the facade and foundations remain of the building.

In 2021, an exhibition commemorating 80 years since the Holocaust in Ukraine was displayed in the remnants of the synagogue by the local municipality and Mayor, Mr. Boychenko Vadym.

In early February 2022, the Department of Cultural and Civil Development of the Mariupol City Council announced that the Choral Synagogue may be included in the State Register of Immovable Monuments of Ukraine. In addition, the mayor's office applied for the restoration of the synagogue under the program of the President of Ukraine "Great Restoration". Furthermore, the Ministry of Culture of Ukraine was said considering the inclusion of the building in the register of synagogues.

Synagogue, Italiiska Street
A third synagogue was built on Italiiska Street) at some time after the Choral Synagogue, but little is known about it.

Synagogue, Nikolaevskaya Street 
A fourth synagogue was built in Nikolaevskaya Street, 28 at some time after the Choral Synagogue.

Architecture
The Choral Synagogue was built in neoclassical style, mainly using brick. The first floor was raised above the ground, and architectural features included high arches, frontal and interior cornices, a decorative triangular pediment with pedestals. The inside featured a columned hall with a place for studying the Torah in Hebrew, benches for worshipers, a stage for reading the Holy Scriptures, and women's prayer galleries.

In the late 1880s, a dome was erected, distinguishing the building from the surrounding area.

Gallery

See also
 List of synagogues in Ukraine

References

External links 
 Postcard of the Choral Synagogue
 Old Mariupol
 Jewish community of Mariupol
 Mariupol Future

Orthodox synagogues in Ukraine
Synagogues in Ukraine
Buildings and structures in Mariupol
Former synagogues in Ukraine
19th-century synagogues